Shmuel (Mula) Shtrikman (21 October 1930 to 11 November 2003) was an Israeli physicist, and a professor at the Weizmann Institute of Science. Winner of the Israel Prize for Research in Physics in 2003.

Biography
Born in Brest, Belarus (then Poland) to Abraham and Esther Shtrikman, sister of Sapir and brother of biochemist Nathan Sharon. Shtrikman immigrated to Israel with his family in 1934. In the first year the family lived in Kfar Saba; a year later they moved to Tel Aviv. In the 1948 Arab–Israeli War he served in the Air Force.

Shtrikman began his studies at the Technion – Israel Institute of Technology in 1950. After graduation with a BSc in 1954, he joined the Department of Electronics at the Weizmann Institute of Science, where he did his doctoral degree in Electrical Engineering, received in 1958. In 1967 he was appointed professor at the Weizmann Institute. In 1981 to 1982 he served as head of the department of the Electronic Physics Institute. In 1994 he was elected to the Israel Academy of Sciences and Humanities.

His research concerned various fields of physics: the behaviour of particles under the influence of a magnetic field; liquid crystals; Lifshitz points; composites constructed from inhomogeneous distributions of ingredients; and calculating the elasticity of composite materials. On this last issue he worked together with Zvi Hashin; their joint work is considered one of the key breakthroughs in the field, cited over 2500 times according to Elsevier.

Awards
Shtrikman received the following awards:
 Weizmann Prize for Science (1968)
 Michael Landau Prize (1975)
 IEEE Magnetics Society Distinguished Lecturer (1984 and 1997–1998)
 Ben Gurion University Applied Electronics Prize (1988)
 R. M. Burton Award by the Weizmann Institute Foundation (1988)
 Israel Prize in Physics (2003)
 Israel Defense Prize (1979 and 1987)

Bibliography
 E. H. Frei, S. Shtrikman, and D. Treves, 1957, Critical Size and Nucleation Field of Ideal Ferromagnetic Particles, Phys. Rev. 106, 446. 
 Z. Hashin and S. Shtrikman, 1963, A variational approach to the elastic behaviour of multiphase materials: J. Mech. Phys. Solids 11, 127–140.

References

1930 births
2003 deaths
Belarusian Jews
People from Polesie Voivodeship
Polish emigrants to Mandatory Palestine
Jews in Mandatory Palestine
Israeli physicists
Israeli military personnel
Academic staff of Weizmann Institute of Science
Israel Prize in physics recipients
Members of the Israel Academy of Sciences and Humanities
Israel Defense Prize recipients